Acanthurus chirurgus, commonly called doctorfish or doctorfish tang in English and barbero rayado or cirujano rayado in Spanish, is a tropical marine fish common in the Atlantic Ocean.

Description
The "scalpel" is used during fights with other doctorfish and as a defense mechanism against predators. Its coloration generally varies from blue-gray to dark brown. 10 to 12 vertical bars are always present, but often faint. The edges of the caudal, dorsal, and anal fins are blue. There is also a faint blue ring that can be seen encircling the "scalpel" on either side.

There is a black morph, as well, but it is neither a subspecies nor a regional mutation. It has only been documented a limited number of times.

Range and habitat
This species is typically found among rocky outcrops and coral reefs. Its distribution includes the Atlantic from Massachusetts to Brazil, and the tropical west coast of Africa.  It has been recorded twice recently (2012, 2016) in the central Mediterranean Sea.

Behavior
Acanthurus chirurgus spends its daylight hours grazing on algae and organic detritus. Its teeth are specially shaped for scraping algae and plant matter from rocks. Because it swallows its food whole, it has a gizzard-like organ in the intestine filled with particles of sand which help to grind food before it starts the digestive process.

Spawning occurs during evening hours in a group event. Each egg is less than a millimeter in diameter and contains a small amount of oil for flotation. The translucent, plankton-like larvae hatch within 24 hours of fertilization. They are laterally compressed and diamond-shaped with large eyes and pectoral fins. Many body parts, such as scales and the dorsal and anal fins, do not develop until the larvae have reached 2–6 mm in length. The "scalpel" does not appear until they are about 13 mm long. As the "scalpel" grows, the anal and dorsal spines shrink. Once the fish reaches around 25 mm in length, it moves to the bottom where it continues to grow, eventually reaching sexual maturity in roughly nine months.

References

Further reading

Acanthurus chirurgus, Doctorfish. Marinebio.org. Retrieved September 11, 2007.
Humann, P. and N. Deloach. Reef Fish Identification - Florida, Caribbean, Bahamas. New World Publications Inc., Jacksonville. pp. 34–35.

External links
 

doctorfish tang
Fish of the Western Atlantic
Fish of West Africa
doctorfish tang